A platform-specific model is a model of a software or business system that is linked to a specific technological platform (e.g. a specific programming language, operating system, document file format or database). Platform-specific models are indispensable for the actual implementation of a system.

For example, a need to implement an online shop. The system will need to store information regarding users, goods, credit cards, etc. The designer might decide to use for this purpose an Oracle database. For this to work, the designer will need to express concepts (e.g. the concept of a user) in a relational model using the Oracle's SQL dialect. This Oracle's specific relational model is an example of a Platform-specific model.

The term platform-specific model is most frequently used in the context of the MDA approach. This MDA approach corresponds the OMG vision of Model Driven Engineering. The main idea is that it should be possible to use a MTL to transform a Platform-independent model into a Platform-specific model. In order to achieve this transformation, one can use a language compliant to the newly defined QVT standard. Examples of such languages are AndroMDA, VIATRA or ATL.

Related Concepts 
 ATLAS Transformation Language (ATL)
 Domain Specific Language (DSL)
 Domain-specific modelling (DSM)
 Eclipse Modeling Framework (EMF)
 Generic Modeling Environment (GME)
 Graphical Modeling Framework (GMF)
 Meta-Object Facility (MOF)
 Meta-modeling
 Model-based testing (MBT)
 Model-driven architecture (MDA) 
 Model Transformation Language (MTL)
 Object Constraint Language (OCL)
 Object-oriented analysis and design (OOAD)
 Visual Automated model Transformations VIATRA 
 XML Metadata Interchange (XMI)

See also 
 Platform-independent model

References 

Software architecture
Systems engineering